Bishalpur is a village development committee in Baitadi District in Sudurpashchim Province of western Nepal. At the time of the 2011 Nepal census it had a population of 4,174 and had 699 houses in the village.

References

Populated places in Baitadi District